The speaker of the Senate of Canada is the presiding officer of the Senate of Canada. The speaker represents the Senate at official functions, rules on questions of parliamentary procedure and parliamentary privilege, and presides over debates and voting in the chamber. The current speaker is George Furey who was appointed on December 3, 2015, on the advice of Prime Minister Justin Trudeau.

Appointment and precedence 

By convention, the speaker of the Senate is appointed by the governor general on the advice of the prime minister.

The speaker of the Senate takes precedence only after the monarch, the governor general, members of the Canadian Royal Family, former governors general and their spouses, the prime minister, former prime ministers, and the chief justice of Canada in the Canadian Order of Precedence.

History of the speaker 

The role of the speaker in the Senate was originally based on that of the lord chancellor in the United Kingdom, who presided over the British House of Lords. In keeping with the role of the lord chancellor, the speaker of the Senate was expected to be partisan; the speaker of the Senate would, at all times, have the right to leave the chair, to participate in debates, and to hold an original vote—unlike the speaker of the House of Commons, who has a vote only in the event of a tie.

The speaker of the Senate was also similar to the lord chancellor in being considered equal to other senators. Decisions of the chair were not binding on the Senate unless the speaker's decision was also the pleasure of a majority of senators. Also similar to the practice of the House of Lords was that the speaker would not intervene unless another senator brought a matter to the attention of the speaker. Decisions from the chair remain subject to appeals from the Senate.

Canada has more recently departed from the traditions of the House of Lords, notably since 1991, when new rules for the Senate were adopted.  The new Standing Orders have made it clear that the speaker of the Senate could intervene without being called to do so by the Senate. The new guidelines move the Senate further from the model of the self-governing practices of the House of Lords, and more toward the chair-governed customs of the House of Commons.

The position was preceded by the speaker of the Legislative Council of the Province of Canada.

Role of the speaker 
The speaker of the Senate is historically responsible for deciding on points of order, only once risen by another senator. However, with the 1991 amendments to the Standing Orders and Guidelines that govern the Senate of Canada, the speakership has generally begun to assert its right to intervene, where appropriate, without being prompted to do so. Therefore, the speaker is, broadly speaking, responsible for the maintenance of order and decorum in the Senate.

As a high-ranking individual on the order of precedence, the speaker of the Senate often receives visiting heads of state and heads of government — this role is not merely ceremonial; the speaker is a real delegate and representative of Canada abroad. They are expected to represent Canada internationally, and sometimes visit other nations on behalf of the Government of Canada.

While the speaker is an officer of the Senate, the speaker as a senator also remains a representative of the province or territory from which they were appointed. Unlike the speaker of the House of Commons, the speaker of the Senate has the right to participate in debates. The speaker has the right and power to cast an original vote, and to simultaneously preside over the voting process (rather than the speaker merely delivering a tie-breaking vote).

Another significant difference between the two speakers is that the speaker of the House of Commons holds a management role within the administration of the House of Commons and chairs the Board of Internal Economy. The speaker of the Senate holds no similar role, as the Senate's Standing Committee on Internal Economy, Budgets, and Administration is chaired by another senator.

In the absence of the speaker in the chamber, their duties are carried by the speaker pro tempore, a senator appointed at the beginning of each session by the Senate. Should both chair officers be absent, any senator can be called upon to take the chair. Irrespective of who is in the chair, their decisions hold the same force as that of the speaker of the Senate.

Ceremony 
The speaker of the Senate performs the Senate Speaker's Parade to mark the opening of a sitting in the Senate with the help of the Black Rod.

List of speakers of the Senate 
Key:

Hays, Kinsella and Housakos are the only current living former speakers of the Senate.

Several speakers have died during their time in office:

 Josiah Burr Plumb, 1888
 Hewitt Bostock, 1930
 Georges Parent, 1942
 Pierre Claude Nolin, 2015

External links 
 Speaker of the Senate webpage

References 

Canada
Government of Canada
Canada, Senate